Chan Fai Hung (5 May 1932 – 2 October 2009) was a footballer and coach who represented the Republic of China (Taiwan) internationally. He competed in the men's tournament at the 1960 Summer Olympics.

Chan is best known as the former head coach of Seiko, where he led the team to 27 major trophies between 1970–85. He died due to illness on 2 October 2009.

Honours

Republic of China
Asian Games Gold medal: 1954, 1958

Seiko
 Hong Kong First League: 1972–73, 1974–75, 1978–79, 1979–80, 1980–81, 1981–82, 1982–83, 1983–84, 1984–85
 Hong Kong Senior Shield: 1972–73, 1973–74, 1975–76, 1976–77, 1978–79, 1979–80, 1980–81, 1984–85
 Hong Kong FA Cup: 1974–75, 1975–76, 1977–78, 1979–80, 1980–81
 Hong Kong Viceroy Cup: 1972–73, 1977–78, 1978–79, 1983–84, 1984–85

References

External links
 

1932 births
2009 deaths
Taiwanese footballers
Hong Kong footballers
Hong Kong football managers
Olympic footballers of Taiwan
Footballers at the 1960 Summer Olympics
Association footballers not categorized by position
Chinese Taipei international footballers from Hong Kong
Asian Games medalists in football
Asian Games gold medalists for Chinese Taipei
Footballers at the 1954 Asian Games
Footballers at the 1958 Asian Games
Medalists at the 1954 Asian Games
Medalists at the 1958 Asian Games
1960 AFC Asian Cup players
Hong Kong national football team managers